Amasya Taşova YİBO SK is a professional handball from Amasya, Turkey. The club plays their home matches at Taşova Spor Salonu.

European record

Current squad
Squad for the 2016–17 season

Goalkeepers
  Yasin Caliskal
  Stanko Kljajic
  Yevgen Sapun
Right Wingers
  Cetin Celik
Left Wingers
  Alparslan Aslantürk
  Muhammet Bozkurt
  Samet Kanberoglu
Line players
  Djuro Karanovic
  Adnan Tayfur

Left Backs
  Oleksandr Petrov
  Viktor Shkrobanets
  Ekrem Tüfekcidere
Central Backs
  Vladimir Djuric
  Oleksandr Yuzhbabenko
Right Backs
  Maros Balaz
  Maksym Byegal

References

External links
 EHF Challenge Cup website 

Sport in Amasya
Turkish handball clubs